Edward Elgar's Cello Concerto in E minor, Op. 85, his last notable work, is a cornerstone of the solo cello repertoire. Elgar composed it in the aftermath of the First World War, when his music had already gone out of fashion with the concert-going public. In contrast with Elgar's earlier Violin Concerto, which is lyrical and passionate, the Cello Concerto is for the most part contemplative and elegiac.

The October 1919 premiere was a debacle because Elgar and the performers had been deprived of adequate rehearsal time. Elgar made two recordings of the work with Beatrice Harrison as soloist.
The American premiere was given on 21 November 1922 by the Philadelphia Orchestra under Leopold Stokowski with Jean Gerardy, cello. The 'Musical Courier' wrote: "About the Elgar there was no dissenting opinion. It is a long work, and it ambles on and on and on, utterly without distinction, utterly without inspiration."
The work did not achieve wide popularity until the 1960s, when a recording by Jacqueline du Pré caught the public imagination and became a classical best-seller. 
Since then, leading cellists from Pablo Casals onward have performed the work in concert and in the studio.

History 
Elgar is not known to have done any work on the concerto until 1919. However, as far back as 1900 the cellist of the Brodsky Quartet, had extracted from Elgar an agreement to write a cello concerto. Fuchs later wrote to Elgar reminding him of this agreement. In 1903, Fuchs' friend, the cellist Paul Grümmer reiterated the request orally, and in 1906 by letter, so the idea of such a piece was not new.

The concerto was composed during the summer of 1919 at Elgar's secluded cottage "Brinkwells" near Fittleworth, Sussex, where during previous years he had heard the sound of the artillery of World War I rumbling across the Channel at night from France. In 1918, Elgar underwent an operation in London to have an infected tonsil removed, a dangerous operation for a 61-year-old man. After regaining consciousness from sedation, he asked for pencil and paper, and wrote down the melody that would become the first theme in the concerto. He and his wife soon retired to the cottage in an attempt to recover from their health problems. In 1918, Elgar composed three chamber works, which his wife noted were already noticeably different from his previous compositions, and after their premieres in the spring of 1919, he began realising his idea of a cello concerto.

The concerto had a disastrous premiere, at the opening concert of the London Symphony Orchestra's 1919–20 season on 27 October 1919. Apart from the concerto, which the composer conducted, the rest of the programme was conducted by Albert Coates, who overran his rehearsal time at the expense of Elgar's. Lady Elgar wrote, "that brutal selfish ill-mannered bounder ... that brute Coates went on rehearsing." The critic of The Observer, Ernest Newman, wrote, "There have been rumours about during the week of inadequate rehearsal. Whatever the explanation, the sad fact remains that never, in all probability, has so great an orchestra made so lamentable an exhibition of itself. ... The work itself is lovely stuff, very simple – that pregnant simplicity that has come upon Elgar's music in the last couple of years – but with a profound wisdom and beauty underlying its simplicity." Elgar attached no blame to his soloist, Felix Salmond, who played for him again later. Elgar said that if it had not been for Salmond's diligent work in preparing the piece, he would have withdrawn it from the concert entirely.

In contrast with the First Symphony, which received a hundred performances worldwide in just over a year from its premiere, the Cello Concerto did not have a second performance in London for more than a year.

In the Australian Broadcasting Corporation listener poll in 2011, the concerto was rated as the best classical piece written in the 20th century.

Music 
This work is scored for solo cello, 2 flutes, 2 oboes, 2 clarinets in A, 2 bassoons, 4 horns in F, 2 trumpets in C, 3 trombones, tuba, timpani, and strings.

The work has four movements:

The first movement is in ternary form with an introduction. It opens with a recitative for the solo cello, immediately followed by a short answer from the clarinets, bassoons and horn.

An ad lib modified scale played by the solo cello follows. The viola section then presents a rendition of the main theme in Moderato, and passes it to the solo cello who repeats it. Elgar considered it to be his tune: "if you ever hear someone whistling this melody around the Malvern Hills, that will be me".

The string section plays the theme a third time and then the solo cello modifies it into a fortissimo restatement. The orchestra reiterates, and the cello presents the theme a final time before moving directly into a lyrical E major middle section.

This transitions into a similar repetition of the first section. This section omits the fortissimo modified theme in the solo cello. The slower first movement moves directly into the second movement.

The second movement opens with a fast crescendo with pizzicato chords in the cello. Then, the solo cello plays what will be the main motive of the Allegro molto section.

Pizzicato chords follow. A brief cadenza is played, and sixteenth-note motive and chords follow. A ritardando leads directly to a scherzo-like section which remains until the end.

The slow third movement starts and ends with a lyrical melody, and one theme runs through the entire movement.

The end flows directly into the finale (again with no pause). The fourth movement begins with another fast crescendo and ends at fortissimo. The solo cello follows with another recitative and cadenza. The movement's main theme is noble and stately, but with undertones and with many key-changes.

Near the end of the piece, the tempo slows into a più lento section, in which a new set of themes appears.

The tempo slows further, to the tempo of the third movement, and the theme from that movement is restated. This tempo continues to slow until it becomes stagnant, and the orchestra holds a chord. Then, at the very end of the piece, the recitative of the first movement is played again. This flows into a reiteration of the main theme of the fourth movement, with tension building until the final three chords, which close the piece.

Recordings 

Elgar and Beatrice Harrison made a truncated recording in 1920, using the acoustic recording process. The first electrical complete recording (using a single carbon microphone) was made in 1928, by Harrison, Elgar and the London Symphony Orchestra. 

A notable later recording was made by Jacqueline du Pré in 1965 with Sir John Barbirolli and the London Symphony Orchestra for EMI. During a break in the recording session, the 20-year-old du Pré left the studio, returning to find a large audience of local musicians and critics who had heard that a star was in the making. On hearing her recording, Mstislav Rostropovich is said to have removed the work from his own repertoire. In an interview, on being asked why the Elgar concerto was not in his standard repertoire, Rostropovich said "My pupil, Jacqueline du Pré, played it much better than I." Du Pré's recording has been praised for its passion as well as a secure technique. Barbirolli himself had an association with the concerto from its first days: he was a member of the cello section of the orchestra at its 1919 premiere; and he was the soloist at one of its earliest performances, with the Bournemouth Municipal Orchestra under Sir Dan Godfrey.

In 1985 the British cellist Julian Lloyd Webber recorded the concerto with the Royal Philharmonic Orchestra conducted by Sir Yehudi Menuhin. The recording was chosen by the Elgar scholar Jerrold Northrop Moore as the "finest ever version" for BBC Music Magazine and won a Brit Award for "Best Classical Recording" of 1985.

The BBC Radio 3 feature "Building a Library" has presented comparative reviews of all available versions of the concerto on three occasions. The Penguin Guide to Recorded Classical Music, 2008, has three pages of reviews of the work. The only recording to receive the top recommendation of both the BBC and The Penguin Guide is du Pré's 1965 recording with the LSO and Barbirolli. Other recordings commended by both the BBC and The Penguin Guide are by Beatrice Harrison (1928); Steven Isserlis (1988); Yo-Yo Ma (1985) and Truls Mørk (1999). The German periodical Fono Forum in its full-feature 2022 discographic survey of the work particularly recommends the recordings made by Harrison, du Pré (live 1964, BBC Symphony Orchestra, Sir Malcolm Sargent), Paul Tortelier (live 1972, BBC Symphony Orchestra, Sir Adrian Boult), Robert Cohen (London Philharmonic Orchestra, Norman Del Mar), and, as more recent recordings, Michaela Fukačová (studio, 1991, Brno State Philharmonic Orchestra, Libor Pešek), Daniel Müller-Schott (2005, Oslo Philharmonic Orchestra, Sir André Previn) and Paul Watkins (2010, BBC Philharmonic Orchestra, Sir Andrew Davis).

Notes

References

External links 
 
 Elgar Concertos on CD
 Guide to the Concerto from Elgar.org – includes a Musical Tour and a History
 , third movement performed by Julian Lloyd Webber, conducted by Yehudi Menuhin
 Cello Elgar's Cello Concerto, BBC
 Discovering Music – Elgar's Cello Concerto, BBC

Elgar Cello Concerto
Concertos by Edward Elgar
1919 compositions
Compositions in E minor